Andrew McClay (born 26 November 1972) is a Scottish footballer who plays for Rutherglen Glencairn.

Career
McClay began his career with junior side Maryhill. He spent six seasons at Lochburn Park. In the summer of 1998, he was part of the Junior revolution which swept through Clyde, being one of eleven players coming from the junior ranks to join the Bully Wee. He was captain of the team which won the Scottish Second Division championship in 2000. McClay was a fans favourite at Clyde, but he was very injury prone, playing only 18 games in his final three seasons with the club.

McClay left Clyde in January 2003, and returned to former club Maryhill, before joining Pollok. 
By 2015, McClay had reached five Scottish Junior Cup semi finals, and lost on each occasion.

McClay was selected for the Scotland Junior team as well.

Honours 
 Clyde
 Scottish Second Division: 1999–2000

References

External links

1972 births
Footballers from Glasgow
Living people
Scottish footballers
Scottish Football League players
Scottish Junior Football Association players
Clyde F.C. players
Pollok F.C. players
Association football midfielders
Rutherglen Glencairn F.C. players
Maryhill F.C. players